Freeman is an unincorporated community located in Brunswick County, in the U.S. state of Virginia.

Oral history of the origins of Freeman, Virginia 
The oral history that is shared by members of the Union Bethel RZUA Church tells a story of two or three enslaved persons, some by the last name of Callis. The brothers, Rufin and Ira Callis were told by their slave-master or owner in Louisiana that if he does not return alive from the Civil War that they are to be given their freedom and a certain amount of gold. The slave-master's last name was Callis; Rufin and Ira took it as their own.

When it became known that the owner died, the oral history goes, in 1866 the two Callis brothers, now free walked for about ten days to Totaro, Virginia. With their large sum of money they were referred to as Freeman. Rufin Callis purchased 900 acres of land for $1 per acre. Ira Callis also purchased "several hundreds" acres. The area is now known as "Freeman", which the named in honor of their freedom.

The oral history tells that the land for the Union Bethel RZUA Church, the adjacent school building (now a cemetery), and the cemetery were parts of the purchased land that was donated to create the Church. To this day, members of the Callis and Robertson families own tract of lands in Freeman, Virginia

References

Unincorporated communities in Virginia
Unincorporated communities in Brunswick County, Virginia